Hepatica acutiloba, the sharp-lobed hepatica, is a herbaceous flowering plant in the buttercup family Ranunculaceae. It is sometimes considered part of the genus Anemone, as Anemone acutiloba, A. hepatica, or A. nobilis.

The flowers are greenish-white, white, purple or pinkish in color, with a rounded shape. After flowering the fruits are produced in small, rounded columned heads, on pedicels 1 to 4 mm long. When the fruits, called achenes, are ripe they are ovoid in shape, 3.5 -4.7 mm long and 1.3-1.9 mm wide, slightly winged and tend to lack a beak.

Hepatica acutiloba is native to central eastern North America where it can be found growing in deciduous open woods, most often in calcareous soils.

References

Ranunculaceae
acutiloba
Flora of North America